The Struma Corps or Usturma Corps of the Ottoman Empire (Turkish: Usturma Kolordusu) was one of the corps under the command of the Ottoman Western Army. It was formed in Ustruma (Struma) area during the First Balkan War.

Balkan Wars

Order of Battle, October 19, 1912 
On October 19, 1912, the detachment was structured as follows:

Struma Corps HQ (Bulgarian Front, under the command of the Western Army)
14th Division
Serez Redif Division
Nevrekop Detachment

Sources

Corps of the Ottoman Empire
Military units and formations of the Ottoman Empire in the Balkan Wars
Ottoman period in the history of Bulgaria
Ottoman Greece
Macedonia under the Ottoman Empire
1912 establishments in the Ottoman Empire